Welsum may refer to:

 Welsum, Dalfsen, a place in the Dutch municipality of Dalfsen
 Welsum, Olst-Wijhe, a place in the Dutch municipality of Olst-Wijhe